Vienna station may refer to:

Railway stations
 Vienna Central Station or Wien Hauptbahnhof, the main station in Vienna, Austria
 Vienna station (VTA), a light rail station in Sunnyvale, California, US
 Vienna Metro station or Vienna/Fairfax–GMU station, a Washington Metro station in Fairfax County, Virginia, US
 Vienna Station, Warsaw, Poland, terminus of the Warsaw–Vienna railway

Other uses
 Vienna Station, Kentucky or Calhoun, Kentucky

See also
Vienna U-Bahn, the rapid transit system of Vienna, Austria
Wien Mitte railway station, a Vienna U-Bahn station with no inter-city connections